Nicolás Evar Gómez Silveira (born 24 June 1992) is a Uruguayan footballer who plays as a centre back for Villa Teresa.

Career
Gómez began his career in the ranks of Danubio, which preceded a move to Boston River on 30 September 2013. Three months after, Gómez joined Miramar Misiones of the Uruguayan Primera División. He made his professional bow versus El Tanque Sisley on 16 February 2014, in one of seven appearances in 2013–14 as the club suffered relegation. Gómez subsequently scored his first senior goal in the Uruguayan Segunda División, netting a stoppage time winner over Villa Española at Parque Luis Méndez Piana on 29 April 2015. Miramar Misiones finished that campaign in ninth position, with the defender then moving to Cerro Largo.

After appearing in nine fixtures for them across the 2015–16 campaign, Gómez departed midway through the season to rejoin Miramar Misiones. He was notably sent off in his final match for Cerro Largo, as well as on his secondary debut for Miramar Misiones on 2 April 2016 against Rocha. He returned to the starting line-up on 30 April for a match with Atenas, but was again shown a red card; in a fixture that also saw him score an own-goal. In total, Gómez made nine appearances for the club in his second spell; receiving three red cards in the process, having got another on 2 October 2016 versus Tacuarembó. In March 2017, Villa Española signed Gómez.

On 27 February 2018, Gómez switched Uruguay for Ecuador after joining Fuerza Amarilla; having only signed for Central Español weeks prior. Goals followed against Manta and L.D.U. Portoviejo in Serie B as they won promotion to Serie A.

Career statistics
.

References

External links

1992 births
Living people
Footballers from Montevideo
Uruguayan footballers
Association football defenders
Uruguayan expatriate footballers
Expatriate footballers in Ecuador
Uruguayan expatriate sportspeople in Ecuador
Uruguayan Primera División players
Uruguayan Segunda División players
Ecuadorian Serie B players
Ecuadorian Serie A players
Boston River players
Miramar Misiones players
Cerro Largo F.C. players
Villa Española players
Central Español players
Fuerza Amarilla S.C. footballers
Villa Teresa players